This article covers the evolution of time-sharing systems, providing links to major early time-sharing operating systems, showing their subsequent evolution.

Time-sharing

Time-sharing was first proposed in the mid- to late-1950s and first implemented in the early 1960s. The concept was born out of the realization that a single expensive computer could be efficiently utilized if a multitasking, multiprogramming operating system allowed multiple users simultaneous interactive access. Typically an individual user would enter bursts of information followed by long pauses; but with a group of users working at the same time, the pauses of one user would be filled by the activity of the others. Similarly, small slices of time spent waiting for disk, tape, or network input could be granted to other users. Given an optimal group size, the overall process could be very efficient.

Each user would use their own computer terminal, initially electromechanical teleprinters such as the Teletype Model 33 ASR or the Friden Flexowriter; from about 1970 these were progressively superseded by CRT–based units such as the DEC VT05, Datapoint 2200 and Lear Siegler ADM-3A.

Terminals were initially linked to a nearby computer via current loop or serial cables, by conventional telegraph circuits provided by PTTs and over specialist digital leased lines such T1. Modems such as the Bell 103 and successors, allowed remote and higher-speed use over the analogue voice telephone network.

Family tree of major systems

See details and additional systems in the table below. Relationships shown here are for the purpose of grouping entries and do not reflect all influences. The Cambridge Multiple-Access System was the first time-sharing system developed outside the United States.

System descriptions and relationships

See also
History of CP/CMS has many period details and sources.
Timeline of operating systems

References

History of software
 Time-sharing system evolution